The Liaison Committee is a select committee of the House of Lords. The Committee advises the House on financial and other resources required by the body's select committees and allocates those resources among them. It is also responsible for reviewing the work of the select committees, coordinating their work with those of the House of Commons, and considering requests to appoint Special Inqury committees.

Membership
As of January 2023, the members of the committee are as follows:

External links
Liaison Committee (UK Parliament page)

Committees of the House of Lords